"Nice to Be With You" may refer to:

It's Nice to Be With You, a 1969 album by Jim Hall.

"It's Nice to Be With You," a 1968 song by The Monkees.